

National teams competitions

Men's senior team

2011 AFC Asian Cup

2014 FIFA World Cup qualification

Second round

Third round

Friendly matches

Women's senior team

Four Nations Tournament in China

2011 Algarve Cup

2012 Summer Olympics qualification

Friendly matches

Men's U-23 team

2012 Summer Olympics qualification

Preliminary Round 2

Friendly matches

Men's U-20 team

Valentin Granatkin Cup

2011 Toulon Tournament
Group B

2011 Weifang Cup

2012 AFC U-19 Championship qualification
Group F

Friendly matches

Men's U-17 team

AEGON Future Cup

2012 AFC U-16 Championship qualification
Group E

Women's U-20 team

International tournament in Russia

2011 AFC U-19 Women's Championship

Women's U-17 team

2011 AFC U-16 Women's Championship

References
China fixture list at Fifa

 
2011
Chinese
Football